Schachter, Schächter or Schechter (from Yiddish shochet, 'to slaughter'. Hebrew:שכטר also Shechter) is a Yiddish and German surname. Notable people with the surname include:

Schachter, Schächter 
 Daniel Schacter, psychologist, neuroscientist, researcher in human memory
 Binyumen Schaechter, composer, arranger, conductor
 Carl Schachter, music theorist specializing in Schenkerian analysis
 Hershel Schachter, Rosh Yeshiva at Rabbi Isaac Elchanan Theological Seminary
 Hershel Schacter
 Joshua Schachter, creator of the website Delicious
 Mioara Mugur-Schächter, French specialist on Physics and Epistemology
 Norm Schachter, American football official in the NFL
 Oscar Schachter, international law and diplomacy professor
 Rafael Schächter, Czechoslovakian composer, pianist and conductor, organizer of cultural life in Terezín concentration camp
 Sam Schachter, Canadian Olympic beach volleyball player
 Stanley Schachter, American psychologist
 Steven Schachter, American director and screenwriter
 Zalman Schachter

Schechter 

 Aaron Schechter, rosh yeshiva of the Yeshiva Rabbi Chaim Berlin.
 Alan Schechter, political scientist
 Ben Schechter, American filmmaker
 Daniel Schechter, American psychiatrist, developmental neuroscientist, researcher in trauma and attachment
 Daniel Schechter (director), American filmmaker and director
 Danny Schechter, American television producer and filmmaker
 Harold Schechter, American writer
 Itay Shechter, Israeli footballer currently playing for Beitar Jerusalem.
 Jody Scheckter, retired racing driver now farmer 
 Martin Schechter (epidemiologist), Canadian medical epidemiologist recognized for contributions to HIV and addiction research
 Mathilde Roth Schechter, American
 Ofer Shechter, Israeli actor, entertainer, model and TV host.
 Paul L. Schechter, American astronomer
 Peter Schechter, American political consultant and author
 Sarah Schechter, American rabbi
 Solomon Schechter, rabbi
 Susan Schechter (1946–2004), American domestic violence activist
 Susan Schechter Bortner, American statistician
 Yaakov Meir Shechter leader and teacher in the Breslov Hasidic movement in Israel.

See also
Schechter Letter, letter discovered in the Cairo Geniza
Solomon Schechter Day School Association, named after Solomon Schechter
Schechter Poultry Corp. v. United States, United States Supreme Court case

German-language surnames
Jewish surnames
Yiddish-language surnames